Krepela or Křepela is a surname. Notable people with the surname include:

 Josef Křepela (1924–1974), Slovak basketball player
 Kristina Krepela (born 1979), Croatian actress
 Neil Krepela (born 1947), American special effects artist and cinematographer